Cadillac is a jazz record company and label in the United Kingdom. It was established in 1971 by John Jack and Mike Westbrook and its first release was in 1973. Its catalogue includes Harry Beckett, Mike Osborne, Stan Tracey, Trevor Watts, and Bobby Wellins.

CDs

See also
Ogun Records
List of record labels

Notes and references

1971 establishments in the United Kingdom
British record labels
Jazz record labels